Vigiliano may refer to:

Places in Italy
Vigliano d'Asti
Vigliano Biellese

People
David Vigliano, American literary agent
Mauro Vigliano, Argentine football referee
Nadia Vigliano, French javelin thrower
Sandro Vigliano, Italian rugby union player

Italian-language surnames